Paul Winford "Pete" Mount (March 10, 1925 – February 3, 1990) was an American professional basketball player. He played in the National Basketball League for the Sheboygan Red Skins during the 1946–47 season and averaged 1.5 points per game. Pete was the father of American Basketball Association player Rick Mount. In his post-basketball career, he worked at the Detroit Diesel Allison Plant in Indianapolis, Indiana.

References

1925 births
1990 deaths
American men's basketball players
United States Army personnel of World War II
Basketball players from Indianapolis
Forwards (basketball)
People from Lebanon, Indiana
Sheboygan Red Skins players